Say No More 1 & 2 is a compilation album by Bob Ostertag, released on April 16, 2002 by Seeland Records. It comprises the albums Say No More and Say No More in Person originally released in 1993.

Track listing

Personnel
Adapted from the Say No More 1 & 2 liner notes.

Musicians
 Mark Dresser – contrabass
 Phil Minton – voice
 Gerry Hemingway – percussion
 Bob Ostertag – sampler

Additional musicians
 Joey Baron – voice (1)

Release history

References

External links 
 Say No More 1 & 2 at Discogs (list of releases)

2002 compilation albums
Bob Ostertag albums
Seeland Records compilation albums